The BAFTA Television Craft Award for Best Costume Design is one of the categories presented by the British Academy of Film and Television Arts (BAFTA) within the British Academy Television Craft Awards, the craft awards were established in 2000 with their own, separate ceremony as a way to spotlight technical achievements, without being overshadowed by the main production categories. It was first awarded in 1978. According to the BAFTA website, for a programme to be eligible to this category it "should contain a significant amount of original design."

Winners and nominees

1970s

1980s

1990s

2000s

2010s

2020s

See also
 Primetime Emmy Award for Outstanding Contemporary Costumes
 Primetime Emmy Award for Outstanding Fantasy/Sci-Fi Costumes
 Primetime Emmy Award for Outstanding Period Costumes

References

External links
 

Costume Design